Janusz Lucjan Bargieł (15 May 1958 – 11 December 2021) was a Polish politician. A member of the Democratic Left Alliance, he served in the Senate of Poland from 2001 to 2005.

References

1958 births
2021 deaths
21st-century Polish politicians
Democratic Left Alliance politicians
Members of the Senate of Poland 2001–2005
People from Olkusz
University of Silesia in Katowice alumni